Ferdinando De Matthaeis (born May 29, 1961) is a retired professional Italian footballer who played for the New York Cosmos. He currently serves as head coach of Miami United FC in the National Premier Soccer League.

Playing career 
De Matthaeis spent the majority of his fifteen-year professional career in New York, with short stints in Italy. He was called in to one National team  training camp towards the end of his career. While he played with the New York Cosmos he enjoyed minutes playing alongside some of the greats like Carlos Alberto, Franz Beckenbauer, and Giorgio Chinaglia. He appeared 38 times over 4 years for the New York Cosmos from 1981 to 1984. During his career with the Cosmos he scored 17 times and assisted on 12 goals in both indoor and outdoor competitions.

Coaching career 

De Matthaeis coached at IMG Academy in Sarasota, Florida  for a number of years, where he developed young athletes in preparation for the next level. In 2014 De Matthaeis moved to Miami, Florida where he became head coach of Miami United FC (NPSL). During his only year in charge he posted a record of 7–3–0 and won the NPSL Sunshine Conference. He became the only Miami United FC head coach to go undefeated during the regular season. In 2015 with the help of another ownership group he founded the Miami Fusion FC of the NPSL. He would coach them in their first season of play to a NPSL Sunshine Conference championship over his former team Miami United FC. With this win he would secure a place for the Miami Fusion FC in the 2016 US Open Cup in their first season.

References

1961 births
Living people
Sportspeople from the Province of Foggia
North American Soccer League (1968–1984) players
North American Soccer League (1968–1984) indoor players
New York Cosmos players
Association football midfielders
Italian footballers
Italian expatriate footballers
Expatriate soccer players in the United States
Italian expatriate sportspeople in the United States
Italian emigrants to the United States
Brooklyn Italians players
New Jersey Eagles players
Boston Bolts players
New Jersey Stallions players
American Soccer League (1988–89) players
American Professional Soccer League players
Footballers from Apulia